Spina is an abandoned townsite in Great Scott Township, Saint Louis County, Minnesota, United States.

History
The village of Spina was established after W.J. Power gained control of the Kinney Mine in 1909.  It was served by a station of the Great Northern Railway.

References

Former populated places in Minnesota
Former populated places in St. Louis County, Minnesota
Ghost towns in Minnesota